MLQ may refer to:

Publications
 Mathematical Logic Quarterly, a logic journal 
 Modern Language Quarterly, a quarterly journal of literary history
 Mon Lapin quotidien, a French comic anthology series published by L'Association

Codes
 ISO 639:mlq, language code for the Kassonke language in Mali and Senegal
 MLQ, the IATA code for Malalaua airport in Papua New Guinea
 MLQ, the station code for Malkera Junction railway station in Dhanbad, Jharkhand, India
 MLQ, the wireless call sign used for the Canadian cargo ship SS Mount Temple

Other uses
 Major League Quidditch, a quidditch league based in the United States and Canada
 Manuel L. Quezon (1878–1944), Filipino president, known by his initials
 Mouvement de libération du Québec, a 1960s organization associated with the Front de libération du Québec
 Mouvement laïque québécois, a Canadian non-profit organization
 Multifactor leadership questionnaire, a psychological inventory

See also 
 Manuel L. Quezon University (MLQU), a private university in the Philippines